This article lists the confirmed national futsal squads for the UEFA Futsal Euro 2018 tournament held in Slovenia, between 30 January and 10 February 2018.

Group A

Slovenia
Slovenia named their squad on 19 January 2018.

Head coach: Andrej Dobovičnik

Italy
Italy named their squad on 28 January 2018.

Head coach: Roberto Menichelli

Serbia
Serbia named their squad on 29 January 2018.

Head coach: Goran Ivančić

Group B

Russia
Russia named their squad on 28 January 2018.

Head coach: Sergey Skorovich

Kazakhstan

Head coach:  Cacau

Poland
Poland named their squad on 27 January 2018.

Head coach: Błażej Korczyński

Group C

Portugal
Portugal named their squad on 26 January 2018.

Head coach: Jorge Braz

Ukraine
Ukraine named their squad on 29 January 2018.

Head coach: Olexandr Kosenko

Romania
Romania named their squad on 26 January 2018.

Head coach: Robert Lupu

Group D

Spain
Spain named their squad on 15 January 2018.

Head coach: José Venancio

Azerbaijan
Azerbaijan named their squad on 26 January 2018.

Head coach:  Alesio da Silva

France
France named their squad on 10 January 2018.

Head coach: Pierre Jacky

References

External links
UEFA.com

UEFA Futsal Championship squads
Squads